The International School of The Hague (often abbreviated as ISH) is an international school located in the vicinity of Kijkduin, The Hague.

School Profile

The International School of The Hague is one of several schools catering to the large international community of The Hague, which exists as a result of the many international organizations, embassies and companies located in the area, such as the European Patent Organisation, Organisation for the Prohibition of Chemical Weapons, Shell plc and the International Court of Justice.

The school population consists of children and young people coming from many places of the world, aged 4 to 18. It became an IB World School in June 1985. The Primary School became the first school in the world to receive accreditation at 'Mastering' level from the International Primary Curriculum.  It is a co-educational day school with boarding facilities available nearby. The school is located in a new building completed in 2006. The school also has use of sports fields in the vicinity. It is subsidised by the Ministry of Education, Culture and Science and subject to Ministry regulation.

Location

After many years in its location at Theo Mann Bouwmeesterlaan 75, the ISH announced in 2002 that it would move to a new location, Wijndaelerduin 1, in Kijkduin. The relocation was completed in January 2007.

On April 21, 2007 Queen Beatrix of the Netherlands officially opened the new school building.

Facilities

The school has a total student capacity of approximately 2000 people. In the secondary building, there is a 350-seats auditorium inside the school. It also has two full sized, fully equipped gyms. There are two computer labs (each equipped with 30 iMacs), seven equipped science labs as well as an expanded library. The school has a canteen, designed to fit 200-350 people. Also the school has expanded their capacity by including two, two-story portacabins. There is also a car park just outside the school. Unfortunately the car park is not part of the school community. There is a car park for staff on the school campus who are privileged to do so, student parking is unavailable.

Curricula

The primary school offers the International Primary Curriculum for students between the ages of 4 and 11, while the secondary school offers the International Baccalaureate Middle Years Programme (IB MYP) for students between the ages of 11 and 16 and the International Baccalaureate Diploma Programme and International Baccalaureate Career-related Programme for students between the ages of 16 and 18.

All lessons, apart from foreign language courses, are taught in English. The study of Dutch is compulsory for students except those in the IB Diploma Programme.  The ISH supports mother tongue education, current provision including Dutch, French, German, Spanish, Italian, Portuguese and soon Romanian and Chinese. Although only Dutch, French, German and Spanish are available in secondary.

For those students whose native language is other than English, or for those with little familiarity with the language, the ISH offers English support lessons in both “beginner” and “transition” levels. Crash courses in English for beginners are provided in the Learning Support Centre (LSC).

Support for Special Educational Needs (SEN) is available.

The school also offers a wide range of optional after-school activities, including music lessons.

Model United Nations

The ISH hosts its own annual model United Nations conference, known as MUNISH. Hundreds of students from other schools (including the British School of the Netherlands, American School of The Hague and also the Rijnlands Lyceum Oegstgeest) attend. The ISH also contributes to THIMUN, the oldest and largest model United Nations conference for high school (secondary) students in Europe and USA.

See also

 List of model United Nations conferences
 American School of The Hague
 The British School in the Netherlands

References

External links
Official website
Rijnlands Lyceum Foundation website

International Baccalaureate schools in the Netherlands
International schools in the Netherlands
Schools in The Hague
Rijnlands Lyceum Foundation